Gerald John Le Mesurier  (1914-1943) was a South African flying ace of World War II, credited with 3 'kills'.

After completing his schooling at Diocesan College in Cape Town, he studied at the University of Cape Town. He joined the Special Service Battalion in 1936 but later in 1936 transferred to the South African Military College, joining the South African Air Force.

He joined 1 Squadron SAAF in November 1940, in East Africa, as a flight commander. He served as temporary Officer Commanding on his arrived and then again in 1941. He was appointed OC in May 1942. He was shot down in July 1942 and hospitalised and was declared unfit to fly in November 1942 and returned to South Africa.

He was awarded a DFC in April 1943. He flew to England to attend a course and receive his medal but was killed in a flying accident.

Record
He was credited with 3 kills, 1 probable and 1 damaged.

References

South African World War II flying aces
1914 births
1943 deaths
South African military personnel of World War II
Burials at Brookwood Cemetery
Recipients of the Distinguished Flying Cross (United Kingdom)
University of Cape Town alumni
Alumni of Diocesan College, Cape Town
South African military personnel killed in World War II